Francis Olmsted may be:

Francis Allyn Olmsted
Francis H. Olmstead, Jr.